East Asian studies is a distinct multidisciplinary field of scholarly enquiry and education that promotes a broad humanistic understanding of East Asia past and present. The field includes the study of the region's culture, written language, history and political institutions. East Asian Studies is located within the broader field of Asian studies and is also interdisciplinary in character, incorporating elements of the social sciences (anthropology, economics, sociology, politics etc.) and humanities (literature, history, art, film, music, etc.), among others. The field encourages scholars from diverse disciplines to exchanges ideas on scholarship as it relates to the East Asian experience and the experience of East Asia in the world. In addition, the field encourages scholars to educate others to have a deeper understanding of and appreciation and respect for, all that is East Asia and, therefore, to promote peaceful human integration worldwide.

At universities throughout North America and the Western World, the study of East Asian Humanities is traditionally housed in EALC (East Asian Languages and Civilizations or Cultures) departments, which run majors in Chinese and Japanese Language and Literature and sometimes Korean Language and Literature. East Asian Studies programs, on the other hand, are typically interdisciplinary centers that bring together literary scholars, historians, anthropologists, sociologists, political scientists, etc. from their various departments and schools to promote instructional programs, conferences and lecture series of common interest. East Asian Studies centers also often run interdisciplinary undergraduate and master's degree programs in East Asian Studies.

Subfields
Sinology
The sub-field dedicated to China, Chinese history, Chinese culture, Chinese literature, and the Chinese language. In the context of the Republic of China also specified as Taiwan studies (Academia Sinica).

Japanology
The sub-field dedicated to Japan, Japanese culture, Japanese history,  Japanese literature, and the Japanese language. The foundation of the Asiatic Society of Japan at Yokohama in 1872 by men such as Ernest Satow and Frederick Victor Dickins was an important event in the development of Japanese studies as an academic discipline.

Koreanology
The sub-field dedicated to Korea, Korean culture,  Korean history, Korean literature, and the Korean language. The term Korean studies first began to be used in the 1940s, but did not attain widespread currency until South Korea rose to economic prominence in the 1970s. In 1991, the South Korean government established the Korea Foundation to promote Korean studies.

Mongolian studies
The sub-field dedicated to Mongolia, Mongolian culture, Mongolian literature and the Mongolian language. Mongolian studies are also presented as a sub-field of the study of Inner Asia (as opposed to East Asia). The American Center for Mongolian Studies was founded in 2002.

Orient
In addition to the above, studies about history of orient have mainly developed in Japan. Orient means areas in North Africa, Eurasia except Europe and islands around them because of chaos due to studies about history of Greater China and Korea under Tokugawa shogunate before 1868 and those about eastern world from establishment of European-style high-educational institutions after that year.

The notion about Oriental history that was made between 1868 and 1945 did not spread on other East Asian areas including Korea as the colony of Japan. There have been some Japanese notable historians about Oriental history but they are less famous in other countries.

History
In universities across the United States, as part of the opposition to the Vietnam War in the 1960s, younger faculty and graduate students criticized the field for complicity in what they saw as American imperialism. In particular, the Committee of Concerned Asian Scholars debated and published alternative approaches not centered in the United States or funded, as many American programs were, by the American government or major foundations. They charged that Japan was held up as a model of non-revolutionary modernization and the field focused on modernization theory in order to fend off revolution.

In the following decades, many critics were inspired by Edward Said's 1978 book Orientalism, while others, writing from the point of view of the quantitative or theoretical social sciences, saw area studies in general and East Asian studies in particular, as amorphous and lacking in rigor.

Critiques were also mounted from other points in the political spectrum. Ramon H. Myers and Thomas A. Metzger, two scholars based at the generally conservative Hoover Institution, charged that "the 'revolution' paradigm increasingly overshadowed the 'modernization' paradigm" and "this fallacy has become integral to much of the writing on modern Chinese history", discrediting or ignoring other factors in the history of modern China.

In Europe, notable scholars of East Asian studies have long occupied professorships at prominent universities in the United Kingdom, Germany, the Netherlands, France and Italy, while recent publications also suggest that the “Nordic countries offer some unique contributions in the field of East Asian studies.”

Journals
Some journals also cover other regions of Asia in addition to East Asia.

Asian Culture
Asian Survey
Bulletin of the School of Oriental and African Studies
East Asian History
Harvard Journal of Asiatic Studies
Journal Asiatique
Journal of Asian Studies
Journal of Chinese Religions
Journal of Contemporary China
Journal of East Asian Studies
Late Imperial China
Modern Asian Studies
Modern China (journal)
New Zealand Journal of Asian Studies
Pacific Affairs
The China Quarterly
T'oung Pao

See also 
 Area studies
 List of academic disciplines

Notes

References

External links 
 Nordic Association of Japanese and Korean Studies

Library guides to East Asian studies